Fuyi River, also known as Luojiang River, Fuyijiang and Fuyihe is a river in China's Guangxi and Hunan provinces. It is one of the largest tributaries of the Zi River. The river's origin is within Cat Mountain, in Guangxi.

Fuyi River's main tributaries in Hunan include Xinzhai River, Dong River, Shuang River, Langhu River, Changhu River, Shuicaoyuan River, Chenjiawan River, Dashui River, Luojian River, Peiziyuan River, Gaoqiao River, Dalian River, Sanlong River, Jiefu River, Heng River, Jiang River, Changlong River, Xiangshan River, Huizhu River, Baizhu River, Niuqu River, Xiangba River, Longyuan Xiaoxi River, and Louzi River. And its main tributaries in Guangxi include Caiyuanli River, Sheling River, Dayuan River, Longxi River, Shixi River, Majia River, Tianmen River, Tongzuo River, Xianshuidong River, Guali River, Chaping River, and Pingshuidi River.

The river passes places such as Ziyuan County, Xinning County, Shaoyang County, Chengbu Miao Autonomous County.

References

Rivers of Hunan
Rivers of Guangxi